1802 in sports describes the year's events in world sport.

Boxing
Events
 20 August — Jem Belcher successfully defends his English title by defeating Joe Berks in 13 rounds at "Hanover Spa" in London.

Cricket
Events
 E. H. Budd makes his debut in first-class cricket.
England
 Most runs – Lord Frederick Beauclerk 106 (HS 54)
 Most wickets – Lord Frederick Beauclerk 7

Horse racing
England
 The Derby – Tyrant
 The Oaks – Scotia
 St Leger Stakes – Orville

References

 
1802